This is a list of key international rankings of Costa Rica

Economy

 World Economic Forum Global Competitiveness Report 2014-2015  ranked 51 out of 144

Government 

Press Freedom Index 2017  ranked  6 out of 180
Transparency International Corruption Perceptions Index 2016  ranked       41 out of 176

Military 

Institute for Economics and Peace  Global Peace Index 2014 ranked 42 out of 162

Society

Economist Intelligence Unit Where-to-be-born Index 2013 ranked 30 out of 80 countries and territories

Historical data

(1) Worldwide ranking among countries evaluated. See notes (3) and (4) also
(2) Ranking among the 20 Latin American countries (Puerto Rico is not included).
(3) Ranking among 108 developing countries with available data only.
(4) Ranking among 71 developing countries with available data only. Countries in the sample surveyed between 1990-2005. Refers to population below income poverty line as define by the World Bank's $2 per day indicator
(5) Because the  Gini coefficient used for the ranking corresponds to different years depending on the country, and the underlying household surveys differ in method and in the type of data collected, the distribution data are not strictly comparable across countries. The ranking therefore is only a proxy for reference purposes.
(6) The Human Opportunity Index study was performed by the World Bank among 19 countries in the Latin American and the Caribbean region, where statistics and census information is most reliable. Therefore, it is a regional index and there is no worldwide ranking available.
(7) The Life Satisfaction Index study was performed by the Inter-American Development Bank among 24 countries in the Latin American and the Caribbean region, based on IDB calculations based on Gallup World Poll 2006 - 2007 and World Development Indicators. Therefore, it is a regional index.

See also
Lists of countries
Lists by country
List of international rankings

References

Costa Rica